William Benet (1381–1463), of Canterbury, Kent, was an English politician and tavern owner.

He was a Member (MP) of the Parliament of England for Canterbury in October 1416, 1420, 1425, 1435 and 1450. He was Mayor of Canterbury in 1449–50.

References

1381 births
1463 deaths
People from Canterbury
Mayors of Canterbury
English MPs October 1416
English MPs 1420
English MPs 1425
English MPs 1435
English MPs 1450